The city centre is the prominent central business district of Sector 4, Bokaro Steel City, Jharkhand, India. It is a CBD and one of the most developed and planned CBD in Jharkhand and Eastern India  Recent years have seen it grow more than threefold in size. The difference of this market and most other major markets in Indian cities happens to be the planning of the market. There is ample parking space, and the approach roads, as well as those inside the market are wide. The place houses almost all major Indian banks, has various shops in the city for clothing, electronics, and the best food joints. 

The latest comers to the market are:

 coaching institutes
 small clinics
 hospitals
 hotels
 restaurants
 mall

Their rate of growth shows the demand these services have in the city.

Market 
This is a main and a major marketplace in Bokaro Steel City. This area has many fashionable stores which include Domino's Pizza, Reliance Fresh, Lenskart and many more. Other stores include vegetables vendors, small grocery and medical stores.

Education 
City Centre is the education hub for IIT JEE, AIEEE and AIPMT aspirants in Jharkhand. FIITJEE, Bansal Classes and some more coaching institutes have their centers here.

Harshvardhan Plaza 

Harsh Vardhan Plaza is a shopping complex at City Centre. This is one of the famous shopping malls in the city. This complex consists of restaurants and branded fashion stores. It has two floors of shopping and its remaining floors are for residential uses by the users. It was built in the 2000s.

This shopping complex has also facilities for parking. Infrastructure of this complex is very well. And it has several outlets. Now and currently it is the major shopping hub of the city. Which haves branded and standard shops and outlets.

Banks 
Bank Tower is a type of building in city centre. State Bank of India has its branch at City Centre, Sector 4. This is one of the major branches of SBI in Bokaro Steel City. There is also presence of the other banks. Bank of Baroda also has its branch at City Centre. Here is also a branch of IDBI Bank, Punjab National Bank, and many more.

Cinemas 
It used to be home for the only cinema theatres in the city, but only one of them (Jeetendra Cinema) is operational now. PVR cinemas in the Bokaro Mall is also a famous cinema theatre in the city.

Languages and Future development 
Here the major languages spoken are Hindi and Urdu. There is a plan to develop this place more by MyWorld Group

Landmarks 

Bokaro District
Bokaro Steel City
Central business districts in India